Peter Welsh may refer to:

Peter Welsh (athlete) (born 1943), New Zealand steeplechase runner
Peter Welsh (footballer born 1951), Australian rules footballer for Footscray
Peter Welsh (footballer born 1954) (1954–2008), Australian rules footballer for Hawthorn and Richmond
Peter Welsh (Scottish footballer) (born 1959), Leicester City, Hibernian, Falkirk and Alloa Athletic player

See also
Peter Welch (born 1947), American politician
Peter Welch (actor) (1922–1984), British actor